Nenjinile is a 1999 Indian Tamil-language action romantic thriller film written by A. C. Jairam and directed by S. A. Chandrasekhar. The film stars his son Vijay and Isha Koppikar, while Sonu Sood, Sriman, Nizhalgal Ravi, Devan, Nizhalgal Ravi, and Manivannan play supporting roles. The film's music is composed by Deva with cinematography by Vijay Milton. The film released on 25 June 1999.

Plot
Karunakaran departs from Ambasamudram to Mumbai in order to seek a job as he can arrange money for his sister's wedding. He lives with his elder sister and meets Nisha, who falls in love with him. Initially rejecting her, Karunakaran later accepts her proposal. Unable to find a job and through his old friend Chandru, Karunakaran joins as a henchman for a gangster named Supari, where he receives money for completing many assignments and is happy that he can help his family and sister financially. Unfortunately, Karunakaran's own gang members plan to kill Nisha after killing her parents. Karunakaran tries to protect her earns Supari's wrath. What is Nisha's connection with the gang and how does Karunakaran save Nisha and his family from Supari's gang forms the crux of the plot.

Cast

Production
Roja was first choice to play the female lead before Isha Koppikar was confirmed. Vijay recommended Isha Koppikar for female role to his father, who signed her on. Vijay revealed he was impressed with her acting despite her lack of understanding of Tamil. An item number was shot with actress Roja making a special appearance in the film because she couldn't act as female lead role. In this film, Vijay appears both in Thulladha Manamum Thullum and Minsara Kanna looks.

During the post-production stages, S. A. Chandrasekhar accused the son of veteran director K. Balachandar of trying to make illegal copies of the film. The allegations prompted Vijay to pull out of a film he had agreed to act in under Balachandar's production house.

Release
The film released on 25 June 1999. It opened to mixed reviews, with the critic of Indolink.com claiming the film Chandrasekhar "screwed up the storyline part in a very major way" while mentioning that the only respite was the film's music. Ananda Vikatan rated the film 35 out of 100. However Kalki gave a positive review "Both Vijay and Chandrasekhar has created a jugalbandi".

Soundtrack

The soundtrack of the film was composed by Deva, was well received by the audience. The lyrics were written by Vaali, Palani Bharathi, Ravi Shankar, Kalaikumar, Vijayan, A. C. Jairam. The song "Manase Manase" is inspired by the song "Tu Hi Tu" from the movie Kabhi Na Kabhi composed by Oscar-winning composer A. R. Rahman.

References

External links
 

1999 films
Films set in Mumbai
Films shot in Mumbai
1990s Tamil-language films
Films directed by S. A. Chandrasekhar